Meleki Hatun ("Angel" died February 27, 1656) was a lady-in-waiting to Kösem Sultan, her son Sultan Ibrahim, and later to Turhan Hatice Sultan, Haseki of Ibrahim and mother of Mehmed IV.

Life
Meleki Hatun had originally been a (cariye or odalisque) member of Kösem Sultan's staff. She became a lady-in-waiting to Sultan Ibrahim after he ascended the throne in 1640. 

In early 1648, the treasury of Egypt was lavished on Ibrahims favourite wives and women, which also included Meleki. In the same year Ibrahim was deposed, and replaced by his six-year-old son, Prince Mehmed as Mehmed IV. Instead of retiring to the Old Palace, Kösem was asked by the leading statesmen of the state to act as Valide Sultan to her grandson, the new Sultan, and Meleki remained with her. 

However, Mehmed's mother Turhan Sultan turned out to be ambitious. Kösem planned to replace Mehmed by another grandson, Süleyman, whose mother could easily be controlled. However, her plan was exploited by Meleki Hatun. Kösem was killed in a palace coup in 1651 led by Turhan's chief black eunuch.

Meleki became a favourite retainer of the new Valide Sultan because of her loyalty to her. She married Şaban Halife, a former page in the palace training school. The couple set up a residence in the imperial capital, Istanbul. They suited to act as channel for information and intercessors on behalf of individuals with petitions for the palace. Meleki received female petitioners, and her husband received male petitioners. Meleki exploited her relationship with Turhan Sultan, while Şaban exploited contacts he had formed while serving within the palace. 

Meleki was accused of having a forbidden relationship with one of Turhan's step sons and with Turhan herself.

Death
The political influence of the couple grew so much that they lost their lives in 1656, when the troops stationed at Istanbul rebelled against alleged abuses in government.

In popular culture
In the 2010 film Mahpeyker: Kösem Sultan Meleki Hatun is portrayed by a Turkish actress Bulut Köpük. 
In the 2015 TV series Muhteşem Yüzyıl: Kösem, Meleki Hatun is portrayed by Turkish actress Ahsen Eroğlu.

References

Sources
 
 
 
 
 
 
 
 

1656 deaths
17th-century women from the Ottoman Empire
Ladies-in-waiting of the Ottoman Empire
17th-century people from the Ottoman Empire
1598 births
Slaves from the Ottoman Empire
House slaves